Ricardo García García-Ochoa (25 July 1944 – 21 February 2023) was a Spanish lawyer and politician. A member of the Democratic and Social Centre, he served in the Cortes of Castile and León from 1987 to 1991.

García died in Aranda de Duero on 21 February 2023, at the age of 78.

References

1944 births
2023 deaths
20th-century Spanish politicians
Union of the Democratic Centre (Spain) politicians
Democratic and Social Centre (Spain) politicians
Members of the Cortes of Castile and León
People from the Province of Burgos